Boulenger's spiny eel (Mastacembelus alboguttatus) is a species of ray-finned fish endemic to India, Myanmar and Thailand, known from Sittaung River, Salween River and Manipur River and possibly Irrawaddy River. Inhabiting large rivers and tributaries, it is consumed by locals but is uncommon in the aquarium trade. It may be threatened by habitat loss for deforestation, dams and overfishing and is harmless to humans.

References

External links
FishBase profile

alboguttatus
Freshwater fish of Southeast Asia
Fish described in 1893